Sheram (born Grigor Talian, 20 March 1857, Alexandropol – died 7 March 1938, Yerevan) was an Armenian  composer, poet-musician (gusan), and folk musician (ashug).

He is known as the founder of the modern gusan (Armenian popular composing) art. He created melodies and songs that are popular to this day:

"The Roses Blossom in the Garden"
"I Beg You, Mountains"
"She is Graceful"
"You are my Muse"
"Undefeated Fairy"
"We are Brothers"

He authored "Like an Eagle", a song dedicated to Armenian national hero Andranik Ozanian. According to Vazgen I, Supreme Patriarch and Catholicos of All Armenians, this song is "one of the most popular and loved songs today", and it is "sung in family circles, at receptions, and on other occasions in Armenia".

A selection of Sheram's works was published in 1959.

References

External links
Biography

1857 births
1938 deaths
Musicians from Yerevan
Armenian male poets